Music for the Hard of Thinking is the third studio album for Canadian pop music group Doug and the Slugs.  It was released domestically in 1982 on Bennett's own record label Ritdong and internationally in 1983 by RCA Records. This recording helped get the band nominated for a 1983 Juno Award.

The album produced three singles. The most successful, "Who Knows How to Make Love Stay", peaked at #25 on the Canadian Singles Chart.  "Making It Work", peaked at #29. The third single "Nobody but Me" did not chart in Canada. Canadian cheese brand, Tre Stelle, uses a sample of this song, substituting some lyrics to match their slogan.

Recording
The album was released on cassette (domestically) and as an LP record (domestic & international).

Reception

Critical response
Music critic Rudyard Kennedy of Allmusic stated:

Chart performance
The album debuted at #86 on the Canadian RPM charts for the week of 12 February 1983. The recording reached its highest position at #22 for the weeks of 2 and 9 April 1983 and stayed in the top 100 albums chart for a total of 30 weeks.

The album was ranked at #90 by RPM for the year 1983 on their RPM Year-End chart.

Track listing

Personnel
Doug and the Slugs:
Doug Bennett - vocals, album design
Rick Baker - guitar, backing vocals
Steve Bosley - bass, backing vocals
John Burton - electric guitar, backing vocals
Simon Kendall - keyboards, 'basso profundo' vocals
John "Wally" Watson - drums, backing vocals
Production:
Glen Kolotkin - Engineer, Producer
Ritchie Cordell - Producer
Ron Cote - Engineer

References

External links
 Doug and the Slugs official website
 Doug and the Slugs at NME
 Doug and the Slugs at canadianbands.com
Music for the Hard of Thinking at phoenixcentre.com
 

1982 albums
Doug and the Slugs albums